Mi mejor amiga is a Venezuelan telenovela written by Delia Fiallo and transmitted on Venevision in 1980.

Flor Núñez and Félix Loreto starred as the main protagonists with Elba Escobar as the main antagonist.

Plot
Graciela Acosta goes to see a gynecologist to see if she can still have children after having an abortion five years before, and her doctor advises her she can as long as she undergoes a series of long and painful treatments. Graciela is married to Willi, a conformist who works at her father's company. He is satisfied with his current life, and his personality clashes with that of Graciela who is hardworking and wants to move up in life. This creates problems in their marriage. On the other hand, Milena breaks up with her boyfriend and decides to move in with her best friend Graciela. However, Milena begins to be a replacement for Graciela because she appears to be the perfect housewife. She cooks, cleans and provides company to a lonely Willi and they begin to fall in love. Graciela later discovers that her best friend and her husband have become lovers, thus creating a love triangle.

Cast
 Flor Núñez as Graciela Pérez Acosta
 Félix Loreto as Willi Acosta
 Elba Escobar as Milena Ricardo
 Eva Blanco as Martha
 Raúl Xiquez
 Manuel Escolano
 Juan Frankis
 Betty Ruth as Carolina
 Fernando Flores
 Omar Omaña
 Elisa Escámez
 Guillermo Dávila
 Estelin Betancort
 Luis Colmenares
 Egnis Santos
 Tony Rodríguez
 Francia Ortiz

References

External links

1980 telenovelas
Venevisión telenovelas
Spanish-language telenovelas
Venezuelan telenovelas
1980 Venezuelan television series debuts
1981 Venezuelan television series endings
Television shows set in Venezuela